The Groves-Cabell House, known also as the DeWitt House, located off Kentucky Route 61 near Gresham, Kentucky, was listed on the National Register of Historic Places in 1984.

It was deemed to be the best residential example of Italianate architecture in Green County.

References

Houses on the National Register of Historic Places in Kentucky
Italianate architecture in Kentucky
National Register of Historic Places in Green County, Kentucky
Houses in Green County, Kentucky